Irina Belova may refer to:

 Irina Belova (heptathlete) (born 1968), Russian heptathlete
 Irina Belova (rhythmic gymnast) (born 1980), Russian rhythmic gymnast